Marco Rossi is the name of:

Sports
Marco Rossi (decathlete) (born 1963), Italian decathlete
Marco Rossi (footballer, born 1964), Italian football defender and football coach
Marco Rossi (footballer, born 1978), Italian football midfielder
Marco Rossi (footballer, born 1987), Italian football defender
Marco Rossi (ice hockey), Austrian ice hockey player

Others
Marco Rossi (Metal Slug), a protagonist of the Metal Slug video game series
Marco Rossi (3000 Leagues in Search of Mother), the main character in 3000 Leagues in Search of Mother

See also
Rossi (surname)